Karka Kasadara is 2005 Indian Tamil-language film produced and directed by R. V. Udayakumar. The film stars Vikranth and Lakshmi Rai in their debuts, along with Diya and Vadivelu in lead roles. The music was composed by Prayog with cinematography by M. Jeevan and editing by D. S. R. Subash. The film was released on 6 May 2005. This movie is popular for Vadivelu's comedy.

Plot
The film begins with Rahul (Vikranth) coming from the US to India to see his grandparents for the first time. He helps a girl (Diya) who was going to commit suicide due to her upcoming marriage. He also performs comedy with Ondippuli (Vadivelu) and falls in love with Anjali (Lakshmi Rai).

Cast
Vikranth as Rahul
Lakshmi Rai as Anjali
Diya as Paaru
Vadivelu as Ondippuli
Robo Shankar as Henchman
Madhan Bob as Settu
Manorama
Charuhasan
Malaysia Zig-Zack German

Production
The film marked the acting debuts of actor Vijay's cousin Vikranth in lead role and Lakshmi Rai (now known as Raai Laxmi).

Soundtrack
Prayog, who earlier composed for Kannada films, made his debut in Tamil with this film. All the songs were written by R. V. Udayakumar.

References

External links

2005 films
2000s Tamil-language films
Films directed by R. V. Udayakumar